FP45 may refer to:
The FP-45 Liberator, a pistol manufactured for the United States military during World War II
The EMD FP45, a type of locomotive produced in the United States